Drum Corps Japan (DCJ) is the administering organization for drum and bugle corps in Japan. 

Most DCJ competitions are held indoors on a floor with different markings from those used in DCI, DCA, and most Western drum corps competitions. The main exception to this is the Tokyo Open which is held outdoors in a baseball stadium.

Competition scoring
Competition scoring in the DCJ circuit is divided into three categories: music, visual, and effect. Each of these categories is further broken into two sections.

Music scores are divided into a brass caption score and a percussion caption score and reflect the level of musical execution by corps members. The two scores are added together to give the corps' overall music score.

Visual scores are divided into a color guard caption score and a performance score and reflect the level of movement execution by corps members. The totals in these two categories are similarly added together for a corps' overall visual score.

Effect scores reflect the overall impact of the show, both musically and visually. Both musical effect and visual effect scores are made up of a repertoire score and a show score. Musical effect and visual effect are scored separately, then added together to produce the corps' overall effect score.

Finally, the effect, music, and visual scores are added together and any penalties are deducted from this total. The resulting number is the corps' final score for that event.

Member Corps 
As of the 2017 season, DCJ's active member corps include the following organizations from the following locations:
 IMPERIAL SOUND, Aichi
 SENDAI Verdures, Fukushima
 THE YOKOHAMA SCOUTS, Kanagawa
 Yokohama INSPIRES, Kanagawa
 Yokohama INSPIRES Alumni, Kanagawa
 White Galaxy, Kanagawa
 Kamakura Women's University Secondary/High School Marching Band, Kanagawa
 White Shooting Stars (Kanagawa Prefectural Shonandai High School Wind Instrument Division), Kanagawa
 JOKERS, Kyoto
 Legend of ANGELS, Osaka
 GENESIS, Saitama
 SONIC LANCERS, Saitama
 Lifeguard II, Shizuoka
 PHOENIX REGIMENT, Tokyo
 Pride of SOKA, Tokyo
 Tokyo Phoenix, Tokyo
Previously active organizations include:
 Maximum
 Kosei Refinado
 SOKA Renaissance Vanguard
 Cherry Blossoms
 G-Pulsation

References

External links
DCJ Official Website

Drum and bugle corps